The IAR 27 was a 1930s Romanian two-seat low-wing monoplane primary trainer designed and built by Industria Aeronautică Română.

Design and development
Based on the earlier IAR 21 and in particular the IAR 22 but the design was simplified to allow for mass-production. The IAR 27 was a braced low-wing monoplane powered by a  IAR 6-G1 piston engine and it had two open cockpits in tandem. More than 200 aircraft were built and they served with both civil and military training schools in Romania.

Operators

Royal Romanian Air Force

Specifications

References

Notes

Bibliography

1930s Romanian military trainer aircraft
27
Aircraft first flown in 1937
Low-wing aircraft
Single-engined tractor aircraft